Hyalurga orthotaenia is a moth of the family Erebidae. It was described by Hering in 1925. It is found in Brazil.

References

Hyalurga
Moths described in 1925